JFI may refer to:
 JetFlite International
 Jesus Freaks (youth movement)
 Judo Federation of India
.jfi, a file extension for JPEG